YRM, or yrm, may refer to:

 Yorke Rosenberg Mardall, a British architectural firm
 YRM, the IATA code for Rocky Mountain House Airport in Alberta, Canada
 yrm, the ISO 639-3 code for the Yirrk-Thangalkl dialect, spoken on the Cape York Peninsula, Queensland, Australia
 YRM, the National Rail code for Yarm railway station in North Yorkshire, UK

See also